Secret societies have been a part of University of Virginia student life since the first class of students in 1825. While the number of societies peaked during the 75-year period between 1875 and 1950, there are still six societies (Seven Society, Z Society, IMP Society, Eli Banana, T.I.L.K.A., The Thirteen Society) active that are over 100 years old, and several newer societies (the A.N.G.E.L.S. Society, the Purple Shadows, The 21 Society, The Order of Claw & Dagger, P.U.M.P.K.I.N., Ls, the Sons and Daughters of Liberty, the Roommates Society, The O.W.L. Society, the One, and The Thursdays Society). The earliest societies, Eli and Tilka, functioned as social clubs; the Zs, IMPs, and Sevens have built a record of philanthropy and contribution to the university; and some of the later societies have focused on recognition or disapprobation of positive and negative contributions to the university.

History
The earliest secret society at the university was probably the no-longer-secret Jefferson Literary and Debating Society, which at its 1825 founding was secret, with expulsion the penalty to any member who exposed the society's secrets. Student society activity for the first period of the university appears to have been confined to similar literary societies, including the Patrick Henry Society, Philomathean Society, Parthenon Society, Columbian, and Washington Society, which were not secret societies; only the last is still active.

At the same time, Greek organizations that were purely social in function (today's fraternities) began to play a role in student life. In 1853, students petitioned the faculty to set up a "secret" colony of Delta Kappa Epsilon. (The UVA chapter was officially founded on November 26, 1852). The first request was rejected by the faculty, coming as it did on the heels of years of riotous behavior; according to university historian Philip Alexander Bruce, the faculty feared the "orderly spirit of the student body acting as a whole or in segments, whether organized into secret fraternities or into Calathumpian bands"; in another session or two, the chapter became established, and other Greek fraternities followed. It can be said generally about the early UVA fraternities that the only "secret" aspect of them was their operation and meeting location; the membership was not kept secret.

The growth of student organizations was interrupted by the Civil War, but resumed thereafter with the establishment of additional fraternities. A few secret societies are recorded during the years 1865–1878, of whom the only one of any note is the Dedils, most notable for being shut down by the faculty after their minutes were found where they had been dropped by the drunken president of the organization.

The Eli Banana Society, established in 1878, represented a new kind of secret society at the university. The new "ribbon society" tended to operate as an upper-class society, drew its members from the "upper class", and sought to exercise control of other student groups such as the Jefferson Society. Other ribbon societies included T.I.L.K.A., the Thirteen Club, the Lotus Society, the O.W.L. (a semi-secret society drawing its membership from the newspaper, magazine, and yearbook staff), the Zeta (later the Z Society), and O.N.E.

The suppression of Eli Banana in 1894 and of the Hot Feet/IMP Society in 1908 coincided with the rise of academic societies, including the semi-secret Raven Society, whose members are initiated in a secret ceremony but is otherwise public. At around the same time, the Seven Society, a group so secret that its members are not made known until their death, appeared. The Seven Society established a new model for secret society operation on Grounds.

While the ribbon societies were observed to draw their membership from the fraternities, and the IMPs and Zs from the ribbon societies, the Seven Society's extreme secrecy meant that the society had no apparent formal connections to the social secret societies. At the same time, its exclusive focus on philanthropy meant that, unlike the Elis and Hot Feet, it functioned as an important contributor to the aims of the university. The Sevens tap not only student leaders, but also university administrators and high-profile personnel. They take their secrecy so seriously that they only tap individuals for membership at locations off Grounds.  It has been suggested that the IMP Society is composed of the Sevens underlings. The other societies founded after 1905 likewise define themselves in relation to supporting the university, whether through recognizing notable or notorious individuals (P.U.M.P.K.I.N.s, 21 Society, Sons of Liberty) or upholding university traditions (Purple Shadows). The A.N.G.E.L.S. Society reaches out to students who may be struggling or those who display kindness or other laudable characteristics.

Eli Banana Society 
The Eli Banana Society was established in 1878 as a "ribbon society". It was an upper-class society.

O.W.L. Society 
The O.W.L. Society was established in 1887. One of its activities was publishing The Yellow Journal, the university's humor publication from the 1920s until 1934 when the O.W.L. Society went inactive, (The newspaper was later revived and was not connected with a secret society). The society announced its reorganization through a letter on October 19, 2013, saying "We resurrect the O.W.L. to support, cultivate and enrich literary culture at the University of Virginia."

The Thirteen Society 
The Thirteen Society was founded on February 13, 1889. It seeks to recognize students "for unselfish service to the University and outstanding achievement in their respective fields of activity". Each year on Thomas Jefferson's birthday The Thirteen Society publishes their new members' names around Grounds. Not much is known about the society except that it is highly selective. Unlike many societies on Grounds, The Thirteen Society is formally recognized by the university.

T.I.L.K.A. Society 
The T.I.L.K.A. Society, commonly called Tilka, was founded in 1889 as a ribbon society after the model of Eli Banana. The name of the society is said to reference "five mystical words," though these are unknown. The society rose in prominence after the Elis were suppressed in the late 1890s, capturing most of the student offices.

Like Eli Banana, the Tilkas combined a focus on student leadership with a social function. Dabney notes that from the 1920s to the 1950s both organizations regularly sponsored formal dances at the university. The organizations were sufficiently integrated into student life by the late 1940s that a Virginia Glee Club album of university songs included the Tilka anthem ("Come Fill Your Glasses Up for T.I.L.K.A.").

Notable members of T.I.L.K.A. included founding member and UVA Law professor Raleigh C. Minor, past UVA football quarterback and alumni association president Gilbert J. Sullivan; and university president Frank Hereford.

The Tilkas are still active at UVA; a 2004 article in the Cavalier Daily describes their "tapping" ceremony.

Seven Society 
The Seven Society was established around 1905. One campus theory says that the group was formed when only seven of eight individuals showed up for an evening of bridge. It signs letters with the seven astronomical symbols for the planets. It is noted for making gifts to the university, often with flamboyant public presentations. It has made several gifts that repeat the number seven. Correspondence to The Seven Society is left at the base of the statue of Thomas Jefferson that is inside the Rotunda. Membership to the society is revealed at death by a banner at the member's funeral. Historically, the group also sent a wreath of black magnolias that was shaped like the number seven.

Society of Purple Shadows 
The Society of the Purple Shadows was established in 1963. It is named after a line from the poem "The Honor Men" that refers to the purple shadows of The Lawn. The group's stated mission is "to contribute to the betterment of the University and to safeguard vigilantly the University traditions.".

Past activities of the Purple Shadows have included anonymous political statements. In the 1970–1971 term, the society gave an ambiguous welcome to Assistant Dean of Student Affairs Annette Gibbs, whose responsibilities included advising female undergraduate students at the newly coeducational university, by tying the doors to her office shut with a purple ribbon. In 1982, following the decision of Dean of Students Robert Canevari to ban the traditional Easters celebration, the group left a letter and a dagger expressing their displeasure. The Dean filed charges against the group with the University Judiciary Committee, which were never answered.

The principal contribution made by the Purple Shadows today is the ongoing support of the honor system. The Shadows leave notecards for first-year students during Convocation to formally welcome them to the Honor System; present the James Hay Jr. award for contributions to the honor system; and send letters in defense of the honor system when the existing single sanction system is challenged. The group has taken other stands recently, including encouraging students to end the practice of chanting "not gay" when The Good Old Song is sung.

Muse Society 

The Muse Society was founded in the late 1960s but was reestablished in 2020. The organization serves to honor and foster collaboration amongst the artistic communities at the university, bridging the gap between artistic disciplines on Grounds. The organization has several recognition traditions throughout the school year, but is more well known for fourth-year recognitions and presenting CIOs on Grounds with messages of congratulations for opening events or artistic achievements. They work under Aristotle's quote, "All art is concerned with coming into being."

P.U.M.P.K.I.N. Society 
The P.U.M.P.K.I.N. Society appeared sometime prior to 1967 when the earliest known dated citation of the group was published in the Cavalier Daily.; its purpose is to recognize "meritorious service" to UVA. The earliest account of the group takes a humorous tone, claiming a connection to a 14th-century "Societe de la Citrouillie" and establishing the society's secret "mystic" motto, "When The Corn Is In The Bin, The Gourd Is On The Vine." The group distributes actual pumpkins, along with letters of commendation, annually on the night of Halloween. The society historically also presented a rotten gourd to an individual whom it felt deserving of criticism on Halloween night, but this practice was ended in 2000. The practice was revived in 2012, with a rotten gourd being presented to Helen Dragas, after the Teresa Sullivan ouster of Summer 2012.

In addition to distributing pumpkins, the society annually prepares and distributes pumpkin pies, along with letters of commendation, for those staff at UVA who often go unrecognized. The society annually distributes letters of commendation at the end of the Spring semester to recognize fourth-year students who have served the UVA community silently and selflessly.

Thursdays Society 
The Thursdays Society was formed in the 1970s as a female counterpart to "The T.I.L.K.A. Society." With the first co-ed class at the university, a few women were admitted into T.I.L.K.A., however, the rule was shortly after reversed. Thursdays was created by the women who had briefly been in T.I.L.K.A. Named after a popular going-out night at the university, the Thursdays society, composed of third and fourth-year women belonging to Kappa Kappa Gamma, Tri Delta, Pi Beta Phi, or Kappa Alpha Theta sororities, fosters female empowerment in a social function. As the Thursdays (as they are known in the vernacular and around Grounds) are not the most secretive of the secret societies, "if you're observant enough around Grounds, you may be fortunate enough to see a gaggle of giggling Thursdays" on your walk to class.

Rotunda Burning Society 
The Rotunda Burning Society is a secret organization founded around 1981 that commemorates the 1895 burning of the Rotunda by burning an effigy of the building each year at the base of the south steps.

Society of the Dawn 
The Society of the Dawn, speculated to have been formed in 1984, is a philanthropic society that seeks to bring attention to incidents within the university community through public recognition and dialogue. Acts by the society have included distributing letters of recognition to faculty members deemed examples of high-quality service during fiscal difficulty and the construction of small displays of flowers to bring attention to sexual assault at the university and promote increased administrative combat of sexual crime.  Most recently, the Society of the Dawn has issued public statements recognizing dedicated student organizations that diversify the university's public image.

A.N.G.E.L.S. Society 
The A.N.G.E.L.S. Society was founded in 1998. It is known to reach out to individuals within the university community who may be grieving or struggling, as well as encourage those who display kindness or other laudable characteristics by presenting them with a white rose and a letter of recognition, encouragement, or comfort. Their emblem are white roses arranged in an infinity sign over a heart. Operating anonymously, this group is known around grounds to be the bringers of happiness and attempt to uplift the university community in subtle as well as obvious ways. They are also known to reach out to random professors, administrators, clubs, and organizations on grounds encouraging them to participate in the Day of Smiles, an event just before spring finals in which they implore the university community to take part in random acts of kindness or to brighten someone's day. This usually results in tables of free food, stress-relieving or motivational activities, and random rubber ducks scattered throughout grounds. The group similarly recognizes noble acts and commemorates Founder's Day by placing white roses on the angels surrounding the Jefferson statue in front of the Rotunda's north steps.

The 21 Society 
The 21 Society announced its founding on June 21, 1999, citing "direct challenge(s) to student self-governance" and claiming an intention to "unify the politically active students of the University." The society has subsequently contributed to the University of Virginia Center for Politics.

Lantern Society 
The Lantern Society is an all-female group founded in 2000. It supports gender equality and the advancement of women at the University of Virginia. Each year, the society presents a faculty member with the Lantern Society Award for Leadership in Women's Education.

Sons and Daughters of Liberty 
The Sons and Daughters of Liberty was established in 2003 as the Sons of Liberty, changing its name in 2011 when it merged with the Daughters of Liberty. It is said to pursue liberty while decrying tyranny. Though the judgments passed by the SDL are done in secrecy, it is well-known and documented that they stand firmly against the Jefferson Literary and Debating Society, the most notable debating society of the university. The group appears to mimic the ideals of the original Sons of Liberty, a group of well-known rebels during the American Revolution. They are known to write and speak in the dialect of the 1700s and to date their writings 1773.

Once every year, on the eve of Thomas Jefferson's birthday, the SDL posts lists of thirteen individuals they deem "Rebels", and a limited number of individuals or organizations they deem "Tyrants". These lists are posted around the university. Short explanations accompany the list of Tyrants, and the Jefferson Society is always listed as a Tyrant, along with its president, who is listed as the "Head Court Jester." The SDL is also known to march down the Lawn on George Washington's birthday, placing a wreath and letter by his statue on the south end of the Lawn. 
When spotted in public, the members of the SDL can be easily identified by their clothes. Until 2021, members wore colonial-style garb (such as the American flag around their necks and colonial tricorn hats). Now, there are reports that members wear monochrome garb, including white, full face masks and wigs to conceal their identities. It is not clear how many members are in the society.

The SDL is known to carry out pranks and stunts around The university, a notable prank being the dumping of tea down the chimney of a lawn room in 2008. The lawn room belonged to a member of the Jefferson Society, and the act was sternly looked down upon by members of The university, prompting an apology from the SDL. Since then, the group appears to have maintained its devious nature on a less damaging scale, and acts against the Jefferson Society may be witnessed throughout the year. In April 2012 the SDL gifted the Jefferson Society with a cake containing a whole, uncooked fish. On the same night, a well-known member of the Jefferson Society was coaxed from his lawn room, only to have what appeared to be flour dumped on him from the balcony above. Previously, the SDL entered the debate hall of the Jefferson Society and rearranged furniture, placed the pedestal in a bucket of tea, and carried out other harmless pranks. In the fall of 2011, there was an incident where artwork and furniture in the Hall were damaged, but it has since been confirmed that the SDL played no part in this. Though the SDL commonly poke fun at the Jefferson Society, they have also been known to bring lightheartedness to the student body by interrupting meetings, streaking libraries, and raucously decrying tyranny to any who may listen.

There is no known way to contact the SDL, though some claim to know select members. The SDL has no known enemies besides the Jefferson Society, and no clashes with other secret societies have taken place. The tapping rituals and processes, like those of other societies, are not known. The group appears to have no connection to the student-organized company of volunteer soldiers, also called the Sons of Liberty, who conducted training drills on the Lawn in 1861 after the outbreak of the Civil War.

Membership to the society is secret until graduation, when members were tricorn hats instead of mortarboards.

Order of Claw & Dagger 
The Order of Claw & Dagger formed in 2006 and is an active society of the McIntire School of Commerce. The Order is known to honor students and professors in McIntire with published letters based on their core tenets of Honor, Excellence, and Humility. Members of the Order wear black uniform cloaks and white masks to maintain secrecy. The group has thought to be called "Cloak & Dagger".

Members do not ever reveal their affiliation with the Order. The Order is thought to have some connection network that students depend on after graduation from McIntire. Alumni of the Order have been thought to give monetary contributions to McIntire under different names to maintain secrecy. The Order of Claw & Dagger logo is now found on the side of Rouss Hall on The Lawn next to that of the IMP Society.

Society of P.R.I. 
The Society of P.R.I. contributes to the community of the School of Engineering & Applied Science. It was established in 2010.

Egala Society 
The Egala Society was founded in the spring of 2015.. Its existence is attested by a letter and items left at the statue of Thomas Jefferson on Founder's Day, April 13, 2016, in which the society asked "Let us leave the troubling man [Jefferson] to history… and not find cause for admiration in the lives of people who could not uphold such principles." In addition to the letter, the society left a whip in front of the statue, a cloth wrapped around its head, and a sign on its torso, as well as a splatter of what appeared to be tar on the ground before it.

Vega Society 
 
Vega Society was declared on October 28, 2020, via an open letter circulated to McIntire administrators, faculty, and student leaders. The letter claimed to articulate grievances with the administration of the McIntire School of Commerce, particularly with regard to faculty diversity, the B.S. in Commerce's two-year structure, and undergraduate admissions decisions. The society's stated goal is to act as a long-term advocate for structural improvement of undergraduate business education at the university. Members are tapped for demonstrating Honor, Courage, and Vision, and select faculty are speculated to be involved as well. Members may elect to reveal their identities upon graduation.

Vega Society is purportedly named for the constellation Lyra, which represents the magical Lyre crafted by Hermes, the ancient Greek god of commerce and herald of Olympus. Lyra was included in Thomas Jefferson's original plan for a celestial dome in the Rotunda, but the project was never completed.

List of societies 
The following is a list of some of the known secret societies at the University of Virginia. Much of the information has been paraphrased from information compiled by University Guide Service alumni and former University Guide Service historian Charles Irons. This list includes societies that are well-attested by reliable sources. It excludes some societies, such as the Raven Society, that have public membership and therefore are not secret societies by definition.

See also 
Collegiate secret societies in North America

References

Collegiate secret societies
Student societies in the United States
University of Virginia